The 2021 IBG Prague Open was a professional tennis tournament played on clay courts. It was part of the 2021 ATP Challenger Tour. It took place in Prague, Czech Republic between 23 and 29 August 2021.

Singles main-draw entrants

Seeds 

 1 Rankings as of 16 August 2021.

Other entrants 
The following players received wildcards into the singles main draw:
  Martin Krumich
  Andrew Paulson
  Daniel Siniakov

The following player received entry into the singles main draw using a protected ranking:
  Matteo Donati

The following players received entry from the qualifying draw:
  Facundo Díaz Acosta
  Uladzimir Ignatik
  Zsombor Piros
  Alex Rybakov

Champions

Singles 

  Franco Agamenone def.  Ryan Peniston 6–3, 6–1.

Doubles 

  Victor Vlad Cornea /  Petros Tsitsipas def.  Martin Krumich /  Andrew Paulson 6–3, 3–6, [10–8].

References

2021 ATP Challenger Tour
2021 in Czech tennis
August 2021 sports events in the Czech Republic